Philip Donald Winn (February 1, 1925 – January 24, 2017) was an American politician and diplomat who served as ambassador to Switzerland and Liechtenstein and also as Assistant Secretary of Housing and Urban Development for Housing under Ronald Reagan. He also served as the chair of the Colorado Republican Party.

References

1925 births
2017 deaths
Ambassadors of the United States to Liechtenstein
Ambassadors of the United States to Switzerland
Colorado Republican Party chairs
United States Assistant Secretaries of Housing and Urban Development
20th-century American diplomats
Politicians from New Britain, Connecticut
20th-century American politicians